Ammatucha porisada is a species of snout moth in the genus Ammatucha. It was described by Roesler and Küppers, in 1979, and is known from Sumatra.

References

Moths described in 1979
Phycitini
Moths of Indonesia